CIE standard illuminant D65 (sometimes written D65) is a commonly used standard illuminant defined by the International Commission on Illumination (CIE). It is part of the D series of illuminants that try to portray standard illumination conditions at open-air in different parts of the world.

D65 corresponds roughly to the average midday light in Western Europe / Northern Europe (comprising both direct sunlight and the light diffused by a clear sky), hence it is also called a daylight illuminant. As any standard illuminant is represented as a table of averaged spectrophotometric data, any light source which statistically has the same relative spectral power distribution (SPD) can be considered a D65 light source. There are no actual D65 light sources, only simulators. The quality of a simulator can be assessed with the CIE metamerism index.

The CIE positions D65 as the standard daylight illuminant:

History

The CIE introduced three standard illuminants in 1931:
 A: Incandescent bulb simulator
 B: Daylight simulator (direct)
 C: Daylight simulator (shade)

B and C were derived from A by using liquid filters. The approximation to real light this provided was found lacking, so in 1967 the CIE accepted a proposal by Judd, MacAdam, and Wyszecki for a new series of daylight simulators, bearing the initial D.

Definition
D65 is a tabulated SPD in increments of 5 nm from 300 nm to 830 nm, using linear interpolation on the original data binned at 10 nm. The CIE recommends using linear interpolation of the component SPDs, S0, S1, and S2 if the application requires greater precision, but there is a proposal to use spline interpolation instead.

Using the standard 2° observer, the CIE 1931 color space chromaticity coordinates of D65 are

Normalizing for relative luminance (i.e. set ), the XYZ tristimulus values are

For the supplementary 10° observer,

and the corresponding XYZ tristimulus values are

Since D65 represents white light, its coordinates are also a white point, corresponding to a correlated color temperature of 6504 K. Rec. 709, used in HDTV systems, truncates the CIE 1931 coordinates to x=0.3127, y=0.329.

Color Temperature
The name D65 suggests that the correlated color temperature (CCT) should be 6500 K, while in truth it is closer to 6504 K. This discrepancy is due to the scientific community's 1968 revision of the constants in Planck's law after the definition of the illuminant. This shifted the Planckian locus, affecting all CCTs, which are calculated by finding the nearest point on the locus to the white point.

References

External links
Selected colorimetric tables in Excel. CIE.

Light
Standard illuminants